College Hill represents an approach to, and landing on, a plateau in the Central New York Region of New York, further located in the Town of Kirkland, west of Clinton. Hamilton College is set on College Hill.

References

Mountains of Oneida County, New York
Mountains of New York (state)